The 1860 United States presidential election in Louisiana took place on November 6, 1860, as part of the 1860 United States presidential election. Louisiana voters chose six representatives, or electors, to the Electoral College, who voted for president and vice president.

Louisiana was won by Southern Democratic candidate, Vice President John C. Breckinridge and his running with Senator Joseph Lane of Oregon. The ticket defeated the Constitution Union ticket of Senator John Bell of Tennessee and his running mate Massachusetts Governor Edward Everett along with Northern Democrat Senator Stephen A. Douglas of Illinois and his running mate Georgia Governor Herschel V. Johnson.

Breckinridge won the state by a narrow margin of 4.90%.

Republican Party candidate Abraham Lincoln was not on the ballot in the state.

This was the first time Louisiana ever voted for a losing candidate since it began popular vote elections for President in 1828. Even when its vote was chosen by the state legislature, the only time it voted for a candidate who did not win was in 1824, when it voted for Andrew Jackson, but Jackson won the nationwide popular vote. Thus, this was the first time Louisiana ever voted by any means for a candidate who lost the electoral vote and popular vote.

Results

See also
 United States presidential elections in Louisiana

References

Louisiana
1860
1860 Louisiana elections